Xanthocarpia is a genus of mostly crustose lichens in the family Teloschistaceae. It has 12 species with a largely Northern Hemisphere distribution.

Taxonomy
The genus was originally circumscribed in 1859 by Abramo Bartolommeo Massalongo and Giuseppe De Notaris, with Xanthocarpia ochracea as the type species. This species has tetralocular ascospores (i.e. divided into 4 chambers).

Description
Xanthocarpia has a thallus that is either crust-like (crustose) or like a shield or plate attached on the lower surface at a single central point (peltate). In some cases, the thallus is absent; in all cases, a cortex is absent. The lichen contains anthraquinones compounds. Xanthocarpia species often have apothecia, which are coloured yellow to orange. These apothecia are zeorine, meaning that the proper exciple (the ring-shaped layer surrounding the hymenium) is enclosed in the thalline exciple. Pycnidia can be present or absent; the conidia have a bacilliform to narrowly ellipsoid shape.

Species
Most Flavoplaca species occur in the Northern Hemisphere. Several are found in southeastern Europe, with a collective distribution extending from the Mediterranean to the Arctic. , Species Fungorum accepts 12 species of Xanthocarpia:

Xanthocarpia aquensis 
Xanthocarpia borysthenica 
Xanthocarpia crenulatella 
Xanthocarpia diffusa 
Xanthocarpia epigaea 
Xanthocarpia erichansenii 
Xanthocarpia feracissima 
Xanthocarpia ferrarii 
Xanthocarpia interfulgens 
Xanthocarpia jerramungupensis 
Xanthocarpia marmorata 
Xanthocarpia tominii

References

Teloschistales
Teloschistales genera
Taxa described in 1853
Taxa named by Abramo Bartolommeo Massalongo
Taxa named by Giuseppe De Notaris
Lichen genera